Amber alert is a child abduction emergency alert message.

Amber alert may also refer to:

Alert states
 Amber alert in an alert state
 Alert state amber in the UK BIKINI state system
 High (Orange) threat level in the U.S. Homeland Security Advisory System

Arts and entertainment
 Amber Alert, a 2012 film, directed by Kerry Bellessa
"Amber Alert", a song by War of Ages from the 2014 album Supreme Chaos
"Amber Alert", a song by Lil Durk from the 2015 album Remember My Name
"Amber Alert", an episode of Bad Girls Club (season 4)

See also
 Red Alert (disambiguation)
 Code Adam, a missing-child safety program in the United States and Canada
 Liza Alert, in Russia